Joey Breaker is a 1993 American romance film starring Richard Edson and Cedella Marley. Philip Seymour Hoffman and Erik King also appear in the film. The film contains some autobiographical elements of its writer and director, Steven Starr.

Plot
Joey Breaker is a successful talent agent who misses purpose in life. This changes gradually after he meets waitress and student nurse Cyan Worthington from Jamaica. Eventually, he quits his job and follows his heart to Jamaica where Cyan serves the population of her native district as a nurse with an independent practice.

Cast
 Richard Edson as Joey Breaker 
 Olga Bagnasco as Karina Danzi
 George Bartenieff as Dean Milford
 Sam Coppola as Sid Kramer
 John Costelloe as Randy Jeter
 Fred Fondren as Alfred Moore
 Gina Gershon as Jenny Chaser
 Seth Gilliam as Jeremy Brasher
 Lewis Black as Pete Grimm
 Philip Seymour Hoffman as Wiley McCall
 Michael Imperioli as Larry Metz
 Mary Joy as Esther Trigliani
 Erik King as Hip Hop Hank
 Cedella Marley as Cyan Worthington
 Laurence Mason as Lester White
 Parker Posey as Irene Kildare
 Sunday Theodore as Morissa Marker

Reception

Awards
 1993 - Audience Choice Award for Best Film at the Santa Barbara International Film Festival.

References

External links
Los Angeles Times Review
IMDb listing for Joey Breaker

1993 films
1990s romance films
American romance films
Films directed by Steven Starr
1990s English-language films
1990s American films